USS Agawam may refer to the following ships of the United States Navy: 

 , a double-ended, side-wheel, gunboat
 , renamed USS Natick (SP-570) during World War I
 , a gasoline tanker
 , a large harbor tugboat

United States Navy ship names